Renee Smith Cleary (born September 18, 1972) is a female beach volleyball player from the United States who participated at the NORCECA Circuit 2007 at Guatemala playing with Jenny Kropp finishing in the 5th position and Carolina, Puerto Rico playing with Jennifer Lombardi ranking 11th.

References

External links
 
 Renee Cleary at AVP

1972 births
Living people
American women's beach volleyball players
Sportspeople from Manhattan Beach, California
21st-century American women